Sarambal is an ancient village located in Kudal taluka. Although Sarambal is predominantly Hindu and Muslim, there are several Christian societies which are located near Kavilkata village. Sarambal is surrounded by villages like Nerur, Kavilkatta, Bao, Saonavde. Sarambal has many wadis including Mhaddalkarwadi(kavil gaon),Parabwadi, Parab Pujarewadi,Bhativadi, Ghanapewadi, Jadhavwadi (Bouddha), Talekarwadi, Durgwadi, Kadamwadi, Tembwadi, Satamwadi, and others. The Nerurpar Bridge connects Malavan and Kudal taluka over the Karli River also known as Terekhol River. Saramabal is known as "SHOOR VEERANCHE GAON". Many youngsters were in Indian Military. RANSTAMBHA built by British in memory of Shahid Jawan who died in Second World War and else.
Sarambal is famous for Devi Sateri Mandir.
Sarambal is famous for 
emu Birds farming name as Shree Mhahalaxmi Emu, karli river.

References

Villages in Sindhudurg district